The 1978–79 AHL season was the 43rd season of the American Hockey League. The league inaugurated the Ken McKenzie Award, for the most outstanding marketing executive, showing its commitment to marketing and public relations.

Nine teams were scheduled to play 80 games each. The Maine Mariners repeated as first overall in the regular season, and won their second consecutive Calder Cup championship.

Team changes
 The Hampton Gulls do not resume operations.
 The New Brunswick Hawks join the AHL as an expansion team, based in Moncton, New Brunswick, playing in the North Division.
 The Binghamton Dusters switch divisions from North to South.

Final standings
Note: GP = Games played; W = Wins; L = Losses; T = Ties; GF = Goals for; GA = Goals against; Pts = Points;

Scoring leaders

Note: GP = Games played; G = Goals; A = Assists; Pts = Points; PIM = Penalty minutes

 complete list

Calder Cup playoffs

Trophy and award winners
Team awards

Individual awards

Other awards

See also
List of AHL seasons

References
AHL official site
AHL Hall of Fame
HockeyDB

 
American Hockey League seasons
3
3